Hits from Yesterday & the Day Before is a greatest hits compilation album by Barenaked Ladies that includes several US singles released 1997–2010. The album was released by Rhino Records on 27 September 2011.

Album contents
Hits from Yesterday & the Day Before compiles singles released in the US in 1997–2010. One non-album single is included; "The Big Bang Theory Theme". The album contains nine songs previously included on Disc One: All Their Greatest Hits (1991–2001), four songs from three of the band's albums released in the ten years since that release (Everything to Everyone, Barenaked Ladies Are Me, and All in Good Time), and the non-album "The Big Bang Theory Theme". No tracks from holiday-themed Barenaked for the Holidays or the children's album Snacktime! are included.

Royalty lawsuit
In September 2015, TMZ discovered court documents filed by Steven Page over "The History of Everything (Theme from The Big Bang Theory)" Page alleged that he was promised 20 percent of the proceeds from the song, which includes revenue generated from this album, claiming former bandmate Ed Robertson kept that money for himself.

Reception

Track listing

Deluxe editions
A limited fan edition of the album has been made available through the Canadian Rhino Records website. This version includes the CD, a signed lithograph signed, a digital version of the album, and a demo version of "Great Provider" recorded in 1988. 250 copies of this edition were made.

Musicians 
 Ed Robertson
 Jim Creeggan
 Tyler Stewart
 Steven Page  (all but 14)
 Kevin Hearn  (all except tracks 1 and 2)
 Andy Creeggan on "If I Had $1000000"

Production
Art Direction: Chris Billheimer
Band Management: Jordan Feldstein, Rich Egan (CAM8)
Mastering/Mixing: Charles Benson
Project Assistance: Mike Engstrom, Linzi Schall, Erin Solis, Manson Williams, Steve Woolard

References

2011 greatest hits albums
Barenaked Ladies albums
Albums produced by Don Was
Reprise Records compilation albums